was a Japanese bureaucrat and statesman, active in the Meiji period of Imperial Japan.

Matsuda was governor of Shiga Prefecture from 1871 to 1875, and governor of Tokyo from 1879 to 1882.

Matsuda was sent to Ryukyu in 1879. He abolished Ryukyu Domain and declared the creation of Okinawa Prefecture in the same year.

References

|-

People from Tottori Prefecture
Japanese Home Ministry government officials
Governors of Shiga Prefecture
Governors of Tokyo
People of Meiji-period Japan
History of Okinawa Prefecture